The Coffee Pot in Bedford, Pennsylvania is an example of novelty architecture.  The lunch stand was built in the shape of a coffee pot by David Koontz in 1927.  It was threatened with demolition in the 1990s, but in 2004 was moved across the street and restored. It currently serves as a gift shop.

See also
 The Coffee Pot (Roanoke, Virginia), 1936 roadhouse in the shape of a coffee pot

References

External links

An eating place near the Greyhound bus stop by Esther Bubley, Sept. 1943 for U.S. Farm Security Administration/Office of War Information.

Commercial buildings on the National Register of Historic Places in Pennsylvania
Historic American Engineering Record in Pennsylvania
Novelty buildings in Pennsylvania
Roadside attractions in Pennsylvania
Commercial buildings completed in 1927
Buildings and structures in Bedford County, Pennsylvania
Tourist attractions in Bedford County, Pennsylvania
Coffee culture
National Register of Historic Places in Bedford County, Pennsylvania
1927 establishments in Pennsylvania